Campylaea is a genus of gastropods belonging to the family Helicidae. It is found in Southern Europe

Species
, it contains sixteen species:

Campylaea bozdagensis K.Ali-Zade, 1954
Campylaea capeki Petrbok, 1922
Campylaea cyrensis K.Ali-Zade, 1954
Campylaea doderleiniana (Monterosato, 1869)
Campylaea hirta (Menke, 1830)
Campylaea illyrica (Stabile, 1864)
Campylaea insolida
Campylaea lefeburiana (A.Férussac, 1821)
Campylaea ljubetenensis (A.J.Wagner, 1914)
Campylaea macrostoma (Rossmässler, 1837)
Campylaea maureliana Bourguignat, 1880
Campylaea padana (Stabile, 1864)
Campylaea planospira' (Lamarck, 1822)Campylaea pouzolziCampylaea ramoriniana Issel, 1867Campylaea sadleriana'' (Rossmässler, 1838)

References

Helicidae
Gastropod genera